The thirteenth season of Dancing with the Stars Australia premiered live on 1 October 2013. Daniel MacPherson continued his role as main host of the show on Channel Seven. However, Melanie Brown had announced she wouldn't be returning for her second season as co-host, in order to pursue a judging role on America's Got Talent.  Sunrise weather presenter, Edwina Bartholomew permanently replaced Brown for this season.

Todd McKenney and Helen Richey confirmed their returns as judges whilst, Joshua Horner resigned from the panel after two seasons. It was later revealed that two new judges will both replace Horner. Former champion and current Dancing with the Stars USA professional, Kym Johnson and actor/tap dancer Adam Garcia became the newest additions to the judges table, alongside McKenney and Richey.

Twelve contestants and professional dancers participated in this season. The celebrities cast were revealed on 27 August 2013, via the networkers website, along with their professional partners and on Today Tonight. This season also marks the show's return to the Tuesday 7.30pm timeslot as it has not been presented in this format since season 7. This was the first time three professional dancers had suffered injuries in the same season; however, only one, Dannial Gosper, permanently withdrew from the show.

On 26 November 2013, Cosentino and professional partner, Jessica Raffa were crowned champions for this season, defeating two female finalists Rhiannon Fish and Tina Arena, who both managed runner-up and third place respectively.

Couples

Scoring chart

Red numbers indicate the lowest score for each week.
Green numbers indicate the highest score for each week.
 indicates the couple eliminated that week.
 indicates the couple withdrew from the competition.
 indicates the returning couple that finished in the bottom two.
 indicates the returning couple that was the last to be called safe.
 indicates the winning couple.
 indicates the runner-up couple.
 indicates the third-place couple.

Average score chart 
This table only counts for dances scored on a 40-points scale.

Highest and lowest scoring performances 
The best and worst performances in each dance according to the judges' 40-point scale are as follows:

Couples' highest and lowest scoring dances

According to the traditional 40-point scale:

Dance Chart

The celebrities and professional partners danced one of these routines for each corresponding week:
 Week 1: Cha-cha-cha, Foxtrot or Contemporary
 Week 2: Jive, Viennese Waltz or Jazz
 Week 3: One Unlearned Dance (Most Memorable Moments)
 Week 4: Paso doble or Tango (Rock Week)
 Week 5: One Unlearned Dance (Hollywood Week)
 Week 6: One Unlearned Dance
 Week 7: One Dance of Two Combined Styles (Fusion) & Marathon Dance
 Week 8: One Unlearned Dance and a Team Dance
 Week 9: Two Unlearned Dances
 Week 10: One Unlearned Dance and One Unlearned Uncommon Dance
 Week 11: Redemption Dance, Cha-cha-cha Face-Off, & Freestyle
 Highest scoring dance
 Lowest scoring dance
 Danced, but not scored

Weekly scores
Individual judges scores in the charts below (given in parentheses) are listed in this order from left to right: Todd McKenney, Kym Johnson, Helen Richey, Adam Garcia.

Week 1 

Running order

Week 2 
Individual judges scores in the charts below (given in parentheses) are listed in this order from left to right: Todd McKenney, Kym Johnson, Helen Richey, Adam Garcia.

Jessica Raffa injured her back and was forced to step off the dance floor for six weeks prior to this week, and was replaced by her personal friend, Sriani Argaet. 
Rhiannon & Aric and Steve & Ash-Leigh impressed with their jazzes which scored them an equal 34/40 the top scores of the night. Brendan's jive was not impressive and scored an awful 15/40. Libby Trickett and Jordan Stenamrk were in the bottom 2 but Jordan had the fewest votes and became the first evicted.

Running order

Week 3 

Individual judges scores in the charts below (given in parentheses) are listed in this order from left to right: Todd McKenney, Kym Johnson, Helen Richey, Adam Garcia. There was not a dry eye in the room as Home and Away starlet Rhiannon Fish and her partner Aric Yegudkin twirled and spun to the top of the leaderboard and a perfect score of 40/40 for their beautiful and very emotional rumba. Brendan & Alana didn't quite have as much success with 19/40 for their foxtrot it gave them the lowest score of the night. Former Miss Universe Jesinta Campbell and her partner Jarryd Brynne along with game show quiz host Tony Barber & his partner Melanie Hooper were announced to be in the bottom 2. Then Tony and Melanie were eliminated leaving Jesinta back on deck.

Running order

Week 4 

Individual judges scores in the charts below (given in parentheses) are listed in this order from left to right: Todd McKenney, Kym Johnson, Helen Richey, Adam Garcia. Rock week commenced and Rhiannon Fish proved that she could rock the frock with her jaw dropping tango which gave her a great score of 36/40 which also was the best score of the night. Sally & Carmello & Brendan & Alana both received 19/40 for their Paso dobles the lowest scores of the night. Then Sally & Carmelo & Sophia & Michael found themselves in the bottom 2. Sally was eliminated from DWTS 2013.

Running order

Week 5 

Individual judges scores in the charts below (given in parentheses) are listed in this order from left to right: Todd McKenney, Kym Johnson, Helen Richey, Adam Garcia.

Dannial Gosper was forced to withdraw from the competition and so the last eliminated pro, Carmelo Pizzino had to step in for him.
Rhiannon Fish raised the bar and showed the other contestants how to party with her Great Gatsby themed cha-cha-cha which placed her on the top of the ladder for the 4th week in a row with 38/40. Brendan & Alana's Twilight themed Tango did not live up to its name with 25/40. Then Brendan & Alana and Sophia & Michael faced the bottom two. But after the second week in a row in the bottom two  Sophia & Michael were eliminated.

Running order

Week 6 

Individual judges scores in the charts below (given in parentheses) are listed in this order from left to right: Todd McKenney, Kym Johnson, Helen Richey, Adam Garcia.

Running order

Week 7 

Individual judges scores in the charts below (given in parentheses) are listed in this order from left to right: Todd McKenney, Kym Johnson, Helen Richey, Adam Garcia.

Running order

Week 8 

Individual judges scores in the charts below (given in parentheses) are listed in this order from left to right: Todd McKenney, Kym Johnson, Helen Richey, Adam Garcia.

Running order

Week 9 

Individual judges scores in the charts below (given in parentheses) are listed in this order from left to right: Todd McKenney, Kym Johnson, Helen Richey, Adam Garcia.

Running order

Week 10 

Individual judges scores in the charts below (given in parentheses) are listed in this order from left to right: Todd McKenney, Kym Johnson, Helen Richey, Adam Garcia.

Running order

Week 11 

Individual judges scores in the charts below (given in parentheses) are listed in this order from left to right: Todd McKenney, Kym Johnson, Helen Richey, Adam Garcia.

Running order

Reception

Viewership

References

Season 13
2013 Australian television seasons